Gaṅgeśa (Gaṅgeśa Upādhyāya) (first half of the 14th century) was an Indian philosopher, logician and mathematician from the kingdom of Mithila. He established the Navya-Nyāya ("New Logic") school. His Tattvachintāmaṇi (The Jewel of Thought on the Nature of  Things), also known as Pramāṇacintāmaṇi (The Jewel of Thought on the Means of Valid Knowledge), is the basic text for all later developments. The logicians of this school were primarily interested in defining their terms and concepts related to non-binary logical categories.

Life
Gangesa was born at Karion village on the banks of the Kamala River, 19 km south-east of Darbhanga in a Brahmin family. According to tradition, he was illiterate in his early years but later he acquired the knowledge of logic as a boon from the goddess Kali. There is a story that he was an idiot from birth, his in-laws always gave him bones of fish when eating. One day he left his home and went to Varanasi. After studying vedas, when he came back to his house, his in-laws like before gave him fish bones. But, this time he refused to eat that, he told them that he's not Ganges but Ganges Misra. Then his family realized him as learned person and welcome him properly. His son Vardhamana Upadhyaya was also a noted philosopher of the Nyaya school. Beyond this, nothing else is known of his life.

The Tattvacintāmaṇi

The founding text of Navya-Nyaya - it is divided into four khaṇḍas (books): Pratyakṣakhaṇḍa (book on perception), Anumānakhaṇḍa (book on inference), Upamānakhaṇḍa (book on comparison) and Śabdakhaṇḍa (book on verbal testimony). The first book opens with a salutation to Shiva.

The Tattvacintāmaṇi (T.C.) is a systematic account of epistemology, logic, and the philosophy of grammar. Other subjects, such as the proofs of God, are treated incidentally.

Gangesa refers to his own teachings as the New Nyaya. This term New Nyaya is not to be understood as implying any great originality in theory on Gangesa's part, but rather originality in method. His work differs from the oldest Nyaya in that he accepts many tenets of the Vaisesika school, and in his arrangement of Nyaya teachings under four headings rather than under the 16 subjects (padartha) of the Old Nyaya.

The newness of Gangesa's method is newness of style and of organization. He is far more precise, more careful to define his terms, than were his predecessors; these virtues of his work are responsible for the fact that perhaps half of Navya-Nyaya literature is based either directly on the T.C. or on a commentary on the T.C.

See also
Ancient Mithila University
Indian philosophers
Indian mathematicians
Nyaya

Notes

External links 

13th-century Indian mathematicians
13th-century Indian philosophers
Epistemologists
Indian logicians
Nyaya
Scientists from Bihar
Philosophers of Mithila
People from Darbhanga district
Scholars from Bihar
14th-century Indian mathematicians